Svanuće is a 1964 Croatian film directed by Nikola Tanhofer, starring Miha Baloh, Senka Veletanlić and Ilija Džuvalekovski.

External links
 

1964 films
1960s Croatian-language films
Films directed by Nikola Tanhofer
Jadran Film films
Croatian drama films
1964 drama films
Yugoslav drama films